Geoffrey Hibbert (2 June 1922 – 3 February 1969) was an English stage, film and television actor.

Biography
He made his screen debut with the lead role in John Baxter's The Common Touch (1941) and appeared in two other Baxter films, Love on the Dole and The Shipbuilders. After the war he appeared in supporting roles in films as well as many television performances.

He was also active at the Players' Theatre in the 1950s and 60s, acting in, among other things, the musical revue "Child's Play" with all words by Sean Rafferty. He was also in the original Broadway production of Sandy Wilson's The Boyfriend, starring Julie Andrews, which ran for over a year at the Royale Theatre, in 1954–1955.

He was the father of the actor Edward Hibbert.

Filmography

References

Bibliography
 Anthony Aldgate & Jeffrey Richards. Britain Can Take It: The British Cinema in the Second World War. I.B.Tauris, 2007.

External links

1922 births
1969 deaths
English male television actors
English male film actors
English male stage actors
Male actors from Kingston upon Hull